Poor Cow is the first full-length novel by Nell Dunn, first published in 1967 by MacGibbon & Kee. The novel is a study of a working-class girl from the East End of London, struggling through the swinging sixties after making one bad decision too many. The novel was adapted for film in the same year of publication.

Plot
Working-class Joy, 22 and dreaming of the good life the swinging sixties has promised, discovers the pitfalls of traditional gender roles when her husband Tom is sent to prison for theft, leaving her to look after baby Jonny. She moves in with her Auntie Emm and manages to keep her head above water by working as a barmaid and occasional sex worker. When Joy begins an affair with a friend of her husband, another petty thief, she cannot help but start to dream all over again. It is only when her child goes missing that she finally realises the emptiness of her daydreams.

Adaptations
Nell Dunn wrote the screenplay for a film version in 1967, directed by Ken Loach and starring Carol White and Terence Stamp.

Critical reception

On 5 November 2019 BBC News included Poor Cow on its list of the 100 most influential novels.

References

External links

1967 British novels
Novels set in London
Social realism
British novels adapted into films
Novels about British prostitution
MacGibbon & Kee books